Victor Paukstelis (Viktoras Paukštelis) (born May 25, 1983) is a Lithuanian pianist and painter.

Early life and education 
Paukstelis was born in Vilnius, Lithuania. A graduate of the National M. K. Čiurlionis School of Art and Balys Dvarionas Music School, he has obtained a Bachelor's, Master's and a Licentiate of Arts degree from the Lithuanian Academy of Music and Theater, a Bachelor's and Master's degree from Vilnius Academy of Arts and has studied at Ecole Normale de Musique de Paris.

Professional career

Pianist 
Paukstelis' repertoire includes piano music by Jean-Philippe Rameau, Domenico Scarlatti, Anatoly Lyadov, Alexander Scriabin, César Franck. He also plays music pieces composed by his brother Vytautas Paukstelis. Victor is the head judge on the judge panel of Musica Amabile young Lithuanian pianists' competitions.

Festivals and competitions 
 2002: Verbier Festival, Switzerland (tutored by Gary Graffman and Boris Petrushansky). 
 2002, 2003: The Music Festival of Pite Alvdal, Sweden (tutored by Jiri Hlinka).
 2003: The International Holland Music Sessions Festival, the Netherlands (tutored by Mikhail Voskresensky).
 2004: West Chester University, United States (tutored by Anthony di Bonaventura).
 2005: Yamaha Pianist Competition, Lithuania.
 2008: Accademia Internationale di Musica di Cagliari, Italy.
 2009: Albert Roussel scholarship Ecole Normale de Musique de Paris, France.
 2010: Cite des Arts de Paris scholarship, France.
 2015 March 26: A recital at Berlin Philharmonic  'Recital of Restless Paintings', Berlin, Germany.
 2015 September 27: A solo recital at Carnegie Hall 'Recital of Restless Paintings', NYC, New York, United States.
 2016 October 27: A solo recital at Musikeverien, 'Recital of Restless Paintings'in Vienna, Austria
 2016 November 30: A solo recital at Carnegie Hall, NYC, USA.

Painter 
Solo exhibitions:
 2012: Beatrice Grinceviciute Museum, Vilnius, Lithuania.
 2013: Beatrice Grinceviciute Museum, Vilnius, Lithuania.
 2014: Marija and Jurgis Slapeliu Museum, Vilnius, Lithuania.
 2016: Pylimo gallery, Vilnius, Lithuania.
 2016: The Niagara Pumphouse Arts Centre, Niagara-on-the-Lake, ON, Canada.
 2017: exhibition "Eclipse" at "Music gallery", Vilnius, Lithuania.
2017: exhibition “Belvedere”, in gallery "Meno forma“, Kaunas. 
 2018: exhibition "Vanishing Portraits" at gallery "Akademija", Vilnius, Lithuania.
 2018: exhibition "I Cannot Remember Her Name" at gallery "Kunstkamera", Vilnius, Lithuania.
 2019: exhibition "Cultural Landscapes" at I. Kant public library, department of art, Klaipėda, Lithuania.
 2019: exhibition "The Dream of an Ornithologist" at gallery “Baroti“, Klaipėda, Lithuania.
2019: exhibition „House of Jäger“ at gallery "Kunstkamera", Vilnius, Lithuania.
2020: exhibition "The Dream of an Ornithologist" at Town Hall, Vilnius, Lithuania.
2020: exhibition „Zealand” at Arka Gallery, Vilnius, Lithuania.
2021: exhibition "Gambit" at Klaipeda Culture Communication Center, Klaipeda, Lithuania.
 
Combined exhibitions:
 2011:  with Tomas Kiauka at I. Simonaityte Public Library, Klaipeda, Lithuania.
 2012:  with Tomas Kiauka at the Lithuanian Artists' Association, Vilnius, Lithuania.
 2014:  with Tomas Kiaukia at Kedainiai Polycultural Centre, Kedainiai, Lithuania.
 2019:  with Sigita Maslauskaite at gallery "Kunstkamera", Vilnius, Lithuania.
Selected group exhibitions:
 2013: Donelaitis 2013, Arka Gallery, Vilnius, Lithuania.
 2013: The Anatomy of the 21st Century, Arka Gallery, Vilnius, Lithuania.
 2016: exhibition „WUNDERKAMERAden“ in gallery "Meno forma“, Kaunas.
 2017: exhibition „Khôra“ at Academy of Fine Arts in Gdansk, Poland.
 2018: Art Fair "ArtVilnius'18", Lithuania. 
 2019: exhibition "Carnival" at Pamenkalnis gallery, Vilnius, Lithuania. 
 2019: exhibition "Recommendation" at Klaipeda Culture Communication Center, Klaipeda, Lithuania.
2021: "Biennale Européenne des Blancs Manteaux", „La Halle des Blancs Manteaux“, Paris, FR
Paukstelis presented his animated painting project “Restless Paintings” in Austria , Germany, USA, and Sweden.

Discography 
 2013: 'Bach Liszt Debussy Victor Paukstelis' (Baltic Optical Disc)
 2014: 'Bach Lyadov Scriabin Piano Music' (Sheva Collection)
2015: 'Rameau Schumann Franck'(Sheva Collection)
2020: 'Mozart, Beethoven, Pärt, Chopin' (Sheva Collection)

References

External links 
 www.victorpaukstelis.com
 www.musicperformers.lt

Lithuanian pianists
Living people
1983 births
21st-century pianists